DeAngelo Glacier is a tributary glacier which drains the slopes of Mount Robinson in the Admiralty Mountains. It flows southeast to enter Moubray Glacier southward of Mount Ruegg. It was mapped by the United States Geological Survey from surveys and U.S. Navy air photos, 1960–63, and was named by the Advisory Committee on Antarctic Names for Richard J. DeAngelo, Airman First-Class, United States Air Force, who perished in the C-124 Globemaster crash in this vicinity in 1958.

References
 

Glaciers of Borchgrevink Coast